Im Ri-bin (born 6 October 1968) is a North Korean speed skater. He competed at the 1984 Winter Olympics and the 1988 Winter Olympics.

References

External links
 

1968 births
Living people
North Korean male speed skaters
Olympic speed skaters of North Korea
Speed skaters at the 1984 Winter Olympics
Speed skaters at the 1988 Winter Olympics
Place of birth missing (living people)
Asian Games medalists in speed skating
Speed skaters at the 1986 Asian Winter Games
Speed skaters at the 1990 Asian Winter Games
Medalists at the 1986 Asian Winter Games
Asian Games silver medalists for North Korea
20th-century North Korean people